Lothar Christian Munder (born 21 July 1962) is a Brazilian alpine skier. He competed at the 1992 Winter Olympics and the 1994 Winter Olympics.

References

External links
 

1962 births
Living people
Brazilian male alpine skiers
Olympic alpine skiers of Brazil
Alpine skiers at the 1992 Winter Olympics
Alpine skiers at the 1994 Winter Olympics
Sportspeople from São Paulo